Mitchell Harold "Mitch" Lasky (born January 18, 1962) is a general partner at the Silicon Valley venture capital firm Benchmark and a former entrepreneur and video game executive. He is the father of rapper and YouTube personality Quadeca.

Education and early career
Lasky received a B.A. degree in History and Literature from Harvard College and a J.D. from the University of Virginia School of Law.

Early in his career, Lasky practiced law at the Los Angeles firm Irell & Manella, where he worked on various technology-related intellectual property cases. In 1993, he joined the Walt Disney Company. He left Disney in 1994 to launch a massively multiplayer online game company, Serum Entertainment Software.

Lasky subsequently spent five years at video game publisher Activision, including a stint as executive vice president of Worldwide Studios, helping to launch Quake 3, Tony Hawk's Pro Skater, and Spider-man.

In 2000, he joined mobile games company JAMDAT as CEO and took the company public in 2004. Electronic Arts acquired JAMDAT for $680 million in 2006. Lasky served as executive vice president of mobile and online games at Electronic Arts from 2006 to 2007, after the JAMDAT acquisition.

Benchmark
Lasky joined Benchmark in 2007 as a general partner. He focuses on identifying investment opportunities in mobile, games, digital privacy and identity, and online education. He has led the firm’s investments in and serves on the boards of Snapchat, Ubiquity6, CyanogenMod, Engine Yard, Gaia, Riot Games, PlayFab, Vivox, Grockit, Gaikai, RedRobot, Meteor Entertainment, thatgamecompany, and NaturalMotion.

In June 2012, VentureBeat asked Lasky about the current state of the gaming industry. Lasky replied:

We have seen disruptions come on a regular basis, like when we have a console transition. But I have never seen four major disruptions come all at the same time. We have disruptions in platforms, business models, content, and distribution. It’s the most exciting time I’ve ever seen.

References

External links
 Mitch Lasky's blog

American computer businesspeople
University of Virginia School of Law alumni
Harvard College alumni
Living people
American venture capitalists
1962 births